Stephen Sleech was an 18th-century Honorary Chaplain to the King who was Provost of Eton College from 1746  until his death.

The son of Richard Sleech, a canon of St George's Chapel, Windsor, he was educated at Eton and King's; and was awarded a Lambeth degree in 1729. He was Rector of Farnham Royal from 1730 to 1752; and then of Worplesdon, Surrey from 1752 until his death on 8 October 1765.

Notes

People from Windsor, Berkshire
1746 deaths
Honorary Chaplains to the King
People educated at Eton College
Alumni of King's College, Cambridge
Provosts of Eton College
Year of birth unknown